The sedolisin (MEROPS S53) family of peptidases are a family of serine proteases structurally related to the subtilisin (S8) family. Well-known members of this family include sedolisin ("pseudomonalisin") found in Pseudomonas bacteria, xanthomonalisin ("sedolisin-B"), physarolisin as well as animal tripeptidyl peptidase I. It is also known as sedolysin or  serine-carboxyl peptidase. This group of enzymes contains a variation on the catalytic triad: unlike S8 which uses Ser-His-Asp, this group runs on Ser-Glu-Asp, with an additional acidic residue Asp in the oxyanion hole.

Their optimal pH is around 3. Most members of the family are produced as a precursor protein with N-terminal and sometimes C-terminal peptides that need to be cleaved off.

Family members

Sedolisin

Sedolisin (pseudomonapepsin, sedolysin) is a serine protease. It is secreted by Pseudomonas sp. 101. It performs hydrolysis of the B chain of insulin at -Glu13-Ala-, -Leu15-Tyr- and -Phe25-Tyr-, and angiotensin I at -Tyr4-Ile-. A good synthetic substrate is Lys-Pro-Ile-Glu-Phe-Phe(NO2)-Arg-Leu.

Xanthomonalisin 

Xanthomonalisin is found in Xanthomonas bacteria. It cleaves caesin and clots milk.

Physarolisin 

Physarolisin (physaropepsin) is a milk-clotting enzyme. It shows preferential cleavage of Gly8-Ser in B chain of insulin most rapidly, followed by Leu11!Val, Cys(SO3H)19-Gly and Phe24-Phe.

It is special in that it is cold-adapted. It was discovered in the slime mold Physarum flavicomum. Similar proteins are also found in archaea.

References

External links 
 
 
 

EC 3.4.21